Easedale Tarn is a tarn in the centre of the English Lake District, about two miles west of the village of Grasmere. It lies in a hollow between Tarn Crag to the north and Blea Rigg to the south, about 910 feet or 280 metres above sea level.  The hollow was formed by a small corrie glacier, and is believed to have filled with water around 11,000 years ago when the ice finished melting.

Its outflow is Sourmilk Gill, named after the milky white colour of its waterfalls, which runs east towards Grasmere. The gill displays impressive water scenery when seen from Grasmere, and from the path to the tarn.

The tarn is a popular destination for walkers. Many people climb the path from Grasmere which overlooks Sourmilk Gill.  The ascent was popular during the Victorian period, and a refreshment hut was even established in the 19th century by Robert Hayton of Grasmere above the outlet of the tarn to service the thirsty visitors.  The hut is long gone, and nettles now grow where the ruins used to be.

References

External links
Lake District Walks - Easedale Tarn Walks Near Grasmere
The Easedale refreshment hut- historical sources including pictures

Lakes of the Lake District
South Lakeland District